Frederick Lauer (October 14, 1810 – September 12, 1883) was a brewer in the United States and the first president of the United States Brewers Association.

Biography
Lauer was born on October 14, 1810 in Gleisweiler, Bavaria. He emigrated to Baltimore in 1822, moving with his family to Reading, Pennsylvania.

His two sons were Frank P. Lauer and George F. Lauer; he turned the business over to them in 1882. 

Lauer died on September 12, 1883. 

In 1885, the association erected the Frederick Lauer Monument in his honor in Reading's City Park.

References

American people of German descent
1810 births
1883 deaths
People from Reading, Pennsylvania
American brewers
19th-century American businesspeople